"Together Forever (The Cyber Pet Song)" is a 1998 song by Danish Eurodance band Daze. It was released as the fourth single from their first album, Super Heroes (1997), and was originally released in Scandinavia in 1997 as "Tamagotchi". The year after, it was re-released worldwide with a new title, proving to be a big hit in Scandinavia and Belgium. It peaked at number five in Sweden, number six in Finland and number eleven in both Belgium and Norway. On the Eurochart Hot 100, the single reached number 88 in February 1998.

Track listing

Charts

"Tamagotchi"

"Together Forever (The Cyber Pet Song)"

References

 

1998 singles
1998 songs
Daze songs
Electronic songs